HMS Ettrick was a River-class destroyer ordered by the Royal Navy under the 1901 – 1902 Naval Estimates.  Named after Ettrick Water in the Scottish Borders area south of Edinburgh, she was the first ship to carry this name in the Royal Navy. She was launched in 1903 and served during World War I. She was torpedoed by UC-61 in 1917.

Construction
She was laid down on 9 July 1902 at the Palmers shipyard at Jarrow and launched on 28 February 1903.  She was completed in February 1904.  Her original armament was to be the same as the Turleback torpedo boat destroyers that preceded her.  In 1906 the Admiralty decided to upgrade the armament by landing the five 6-pounder naval guns and shipping three 12-pounder (8 cwt) guns.  Two would be mounted abeam at the forecastle break and the third gun would be mounted on the quarterdeck.

Pre-War
After commissioning she was assigned to the East Coast Destroyer Flotilla of the 1st Fleet and based at Harwich. On 27 April 1908 the Eastern Flotilla departed Harwich for live fire and night manoeuvres.  During these exercises the light cruiser  rammed and sank the destroyer  and then damaged the destroyer .

In April 1909 she was assigned to the 3rd Destroyer Flotilla on its formation at Harwich. She was assigned to the 5th Destroyer Flotilla of the 2nd Fleet with a nucleus crew.

On 30 August 1912 the Admiralty directed all destroyer classes were to be designated by letters starting with 'A'.  The ships of the River class were assigned to the E class.  After 30 September 1913, she was known as an E-class destroyer and had the letter ‘E’ painted on the hull below the bridge area and on either the fore or aft funnel.

World War I
The 9th Flotilla was a patrol flotilla tasked with anti-submarine and counter-mining patrols in the Firth of Forth area. By September 1914, she was deployed to Portsmouth and the Dover Patrol. Here she provided anti-submarine and counter-mining patrols and defended the Dover Barrage.

In August 1915 with the amalgamation of the 7th and 9th Flotillas, she was assigned to the 1st Destroyer Flotilla when it was redeployed to Portsmouth in November 1916.  She was equipped with depth charges for employment in anti-submarine patrols, escorting of merchant ships and defending the Dover Barrage.  In the spring of 1917 as the convoy system was being introduced the 1st Flotilla was employed in convoy escort duties in the English Channel for the remainder of the war.

Loss
On 7 July 1917 she was torpedoed by the German submarine UC-61, 15 miles south by west of Beachy Head in the English Channel with the loss of 49 officers and men.  She lost her bows and was towed back to port. She was not repaired and was instead hulked until the end of the First World War.  She was sold on 27 May 1919 to the James Dredging Company for breaking.

Pennant numbers

References

Bibliography

 

 

River-class destroyers
1903 ships